Tapanahoni is a resort in Suriname, located in the Sipaliwini District.  Its population at the 2012 census was 13,808. Tapanahoni is a part of Sipaliwini which has no capital, but is directly governed from Paramaribo. Tapanahony is an enormous resort which encompasses a quarter of the country of Suriname. The most important town is Diitabiki (old name: Drietabbetje) which is the residence of the granman of the Ndyuka people since 1950, and the location of the oracle.

The disputed area of south-east Suriname between the Marowini (the eastern tributary river) and the Litani rivers belongs to the Tapanahoni resort.

History
The Ndyuka people are of African descent, and were shipped as slaves to Suriname in the 17-18th century to work on Dutch-owned colonial plantations. The escaped slaves moved into the rainforest, and banded together. There were frequent clashes between the colonists and the Ndyuka, however in 1760, a peace treaty was signed granting the Ndyuka autonomy. From 1761, the Ndyuka gradually moved southwards in order to protected themselves from the colonists, and started to build camps on the Tapanahoni River dispelling the indigenous Tiriyó. Slaves who had recently fled from Armina and Boven Commewijne were stationed at Poeloegoedoe near the confluence of the Tapanahoni and Lawa River to guard against attacks by the Aluku. In December 1791, Philip Stoelman founded a military outpost on Stoelmanseiland, thus establishing a militarised border between the Ndyuka held territory and the Colony of Suriname. In 1857, the granman of the Ndyuka was given a yearly allowance of ƒ1,000 (2018: €10,233) by the Government of Suriname. 

The area was an unknown area for the white settlers, and was not explored until the beginning of the 20th century. Still the explorers first had to request an audience with the granman. Gerard Versteeg, leader of a 1904 expedition, expressed his frustration in his diary about having to wait four days before being granted permission to continue his journey.

In 1983, the Sipaliwini District was created. On 11 September 2019, a new resort was created out of Tapanahony, and is called Pamacca. The Pamacca resort is the northern part of Tapanahony, and mainly inhabited by the Paramaccan people.

Villages
The resort of Tapanahony consists of about 49 Ndyuka villages and 14 indigenous villages.

Source: Planning Office Suriname - Districts 2009-2013 - Table 3.1

Notes

References

Resorts of Suriname
Populated places in Sipaliwini District